The L-series (Linke) trains are temporary trains run by railway bureaus of the People's Republic of China at times when they are thought to be necessary, such as the Chunyun period.

History

1940–1960 
The very first L-series trains appeared during the Anti-Japanese war, when the national railway network was entirely operated by South Manzhou Railway(南满铁路), and controlled by Japan. After the victory of the war, the country was founded, and the National Railway Bureau(国家铁路局), which once called China People's Railway(中国人民铁道) was founded. Then, to meet the transport needs during the Spring Festival (Chunyun), the bureau started a "temporary passenger service", which was usually operated using freight wagons as a result of a lack of passenger coaches.

The Cultural Revolution 
During the Cultural Revolution, the national railway bureau was taken control from the government, and more trains to meet the needs of revolutionaries to move around the country. More "temporary passenger services" had to be made, this time with more freight wagons and passenger coaches. It was also a time when there's many serious injuries in those trains, and even deaths.

1976–1990 
After the downfall of "the gang of four", the national railway bureau was controlled by the government again, and more L-series services had to be made to transport the huge flows of people rushing home during the Spring Festival. The flow of east and south coming people looking for jobs made it even worse. The trains were too crowded that passengers even had to push themselves into windows to get on the trains. L-series trains were still operated, but with less and less freight wagons and more commuter coaches (known as coach type 30).

1990–2000 
With more and more passenger coaches were made, those services provided by freight wagons finally stopped the L-series services in 2000. Meanwhile, the fourth railway speed-up campaign made more faster services and more L-series trains in a higher speed. The L-series trains began to run as the same priority of 1- or 2- trains instead of the lowest level.

2000–2015 
The national railway bureau improved the L-series train services during the 5th and 6th railway speed-up campaign.

2015– 
In 2015 all the L-series trains were replaced by trains with a temporary number of 3- and 4-, and the new fast and express temporary trains was introduced. The L-series was then divided into K-series (K3*** and K4***), T-series (T3*** and T4***), Z-series (Z3*** and Z4***). 

CRH also provides high-speed temporary services within D-series (D3*** and D4***) and G-series (G3*** and G4***).

References

Passenger rail transport in China